Bernardino José de Campos Júnior (6 September 1841 — 18 January 1915) was a Brazilian politician. He was governor of São Paulo from 23 August 1892 to 15 April 1896 and 3 July 1902 to 1 May 1904.

Campos was born in Pouso Alegre. He served as the President of the Chamber of Deputies from 1891 to 1892. He was also Minister of Finance from 1896 to 1898, and a senator.

The city of Bernardino de Campos is named after him.

References

Bibliography
SANTOS, José Maria dos, Bernardino de Campos e o Partido Republicano Paulista, Rj, Jose Olympio, 1960.

External links
Mensagem ao Congresso do Estado 1893
Mensagem ao Congresso do Estado 1894
Mensagem ao Congresso do Estado 1895
Mensagem ao Congresso do Estado 1896
Mensagem ao Congresso do Estado 1903
Mensagem ao Congresso do Estado 1904

Governors of São Paulo (state)
Presidents of the Chamber of Deputies (Brazil)
University of São Paulo alumni
1915 deaths
Finance Ministers of Brazil
Members of the Federal Senate (Brazil)
1841 births